WLBL-FM (91.9 FM) is a radio station licensed to Wausau, Wisconsin. The station is part of Wisconsin Public Radio (WPR), and airs WPR's "Ideas Network", consisting of news and talk programming. WLBL-FM also broadcasts local news and programming from studios in the Center for Civic Engagement at the University of Wisconsin-Marathon County in Wausau.

In a share-time arrangement, WLBL shares 91.9 with WXPW, a satellite of WXPR in Rhinelander.  WLBL airs from midnight to 6 pm Monday through Friday and from 5 pm to midnight on Sunday. Because of this, an HD Radio subchannel of the full Ideas Network schedule is heard on the third digital subchannel of WHRM-FM (90.9), a sister station to WLBL which carries WPR's NPR News and Classical service. In September 2017, the WHRM-HD3 signal began to be translated full-time as an analog signal over W267BB (101.3) in the Wausau area.

References

External links
Wisconsin Public Radio

LBL-FM
Wisconsin Public Radio
NPR member stations
Radio stations established in 1994
1994 establishments in Wisconsin